Susan Eisenberg is an American voice actress. She is best known as the voice of Wonder Woman in the  animated shows Justice League and Justice League Unlimited, a role she later reprised in several animated films and video games.

Life
Eisenberg was born into a Jewish family.

Her early work included the role of Viper on Jackie Chan Adventures. Her breakout role was that of Wonder Woman in the television series Justice League, which she reprised in Justice League Unlimited, as well as the direct-to-DVD films Superman/Batman: Apocalypse, Justice League: Doom and Justice League vs. the Fatal Five. She also voiced Wonder Woman in the video game Injustice: Gods Among Us and its sequel Injustice 2.

She continued her voice work in video games such as Star Wars: The Force Unleashed (Shaak Ti), Jak II (Ashelin), Daxter (Taryn), Mass Effect 3 (Councilor Irissa) and The Elder Scrolls V: Skyrim.

Education
Eisenberg studied acting and voice at American University (Washington, D.C.), AADA (New York City) and UCLA.

Filmography

Voice over roles

Film

Television

Video games

: Replacement for Gina Torres who voiced her until DLC 8 Sons of Trigon.

Theme parks

Live action roles

Film

Television

References

External links
 
 

Living people
American Academy of Dramatic Arts alumni
American film actresses
American television actresses
American University alumni
American video game actresses
American voice actresses
Jewish American actresses
University of California, Los Angeles alumni
Year of birth missing (living people)
20th-century American actresses
21st-century American actresses
20th-century American Jews
21st-century American Jews